Ugo D'Alessio (1909–1979) was an Italian film actor.

Selected filmography

 Malaspina (1947) - Nicola
 Madunnella (1948) - Il ragionere, padre di Maria
 Assunta Spina (1948) - Epanimonda Pesce
 Red Moon (1951) - Gesualdo
 One Hundred Little Mothers (1952)
 Toto in Color (1952)
 The City Stands Trial (1952) - Gennaro Ruotolo (uncredited)
 Rosalba, la fanciulla di Pompei (1952) - Nicolino
 Voto di marinaio (1953)
 Soli per le strade (1953)
 Two Nights with Cleopatra (1954) - Cocis
 Mid-Century Loves (1954) - The Octopus Vendor (segment "Napoli 1943")
 Where Is Freedom? (1954) - Un giudice
 The Doctor of the Mad (1954)
 Questi fantasmi (1954)
 Milanese in Naples (1954) - Cantante col mandolino
 I giorni più belli (1956) - Il napoletano che annota la targa
 Carmela è una bambola (1958) - Don Arcangelo Di Capua
 La sposa (1958) - Il prete
 Addio per sempre! (1958)
 Gastone (1960) - The scornful Comedian at 'Salone Margherita' (uncredited)
 La contessa azzurra (1960) - Armandino
 Appuntamento a Ischia (1960) - Antonio Argenti
 Everybody Go Home (1960) - Prete
 Garibaldi (1961) - Secretary
 Totòtruffa 62 (1961) - Decio Cavallo
 The Last Judgment (1961)
 Gold of Rome (1961) - Piperno the goldsmith
 Toto vs. the Four (1963) - Di Sabato
 The Little Nuns (1963) - Movie director
 Shoot Loud, Louder... I Don't Understand (1966)
 The Day of the Owl (1968) - Second Mafioso at the Banquet
 Caprice Italian Style (1968) - Il commissario di PS (segment "Mostro della domenica, Il")
 Operazione ricchezza (1968)
 Ninì Tirabusciò: la donna che inventò la mossa (1970)
 Gang War in Naples (1972)  - Pietro - Tonino's Father
 Don't Torture a Duckling (1972) - Captain Modesti
 The Adventures of Pinocchio (1972, TV Mini-Series) - Mastro Ciliegia
 Bread and Chocolate (1974) - Pietro
 Il gioco della verità (1974)
 Una sera c'incontrammo (1975) - Aniello Capuozzo
 Sette note in nero (1977) - Art Gallery Owner

References

Bibliography
 Goble, Alan. The Complete Index to Literary Sources in Film. Walter de Gruyter, 1999.

External links

1909 births
1979 deaths
Male actors from Naples
Italian male film actors
20th-century Italian male actors
Italian male stage actors